is a Japanese footballer who plays as a left back for Shonan Bellmare and the Japan national team.

Club career

Shonan Bellmare
Sugioka joined Shonan Bellmare in 2017 straight from Funabashi Municipal High School, aged 17 and took the number 29 shirt. He was immediately involved in the first XI and was handed his J2 League debut by Cho Kwi-jae on 26 February 2017, a 1-0 win over Mito Hollyhock where Sugioka played the full 90 minutes. In his first home game, Sugioka scored his first professional goal in a 3-1 win over Thespakusatsu Gunma, after running past a number of defenders and scoring with a fine left-footed finish. Sugioka went on to make 37 appearances in his first full season – an integral part of the team that eventually won the league and gained promotion into the J1 League.

Sugioka made his J1 League debut in a 2-1 win over V-Varen Nagasaki and played 30 league games in total, with Shonan Bellmare finishing in 13th position in their first season back in the top-flight. The unquestionable highlight of the season however lifting the 2018 J.League Cup after a 1-0 victory in the final against Yokohama F. Marinos. Sugioka scored the only goal of the game in the 36th minute, an incredible strike from outside of the box into the top corner. This was their first time lifting the trophy.

Shonan couldn't carry their cup success of the 2018 season into the 2019 season and struggled throughout, getting knocked out at the group stages of the 2019 J.League Cup and finishing in 16th place in the league. Only a relegation playoff result against Tokushima Vortis saved them from being relegated. Sugioka made 34 appearances in all competitions, scoring two goals. He did appear for the first time in a continental competition, coming on as a second half substitute in Shonan's 4-0 defeat to Athletico Paranaense in the J.League Cup / Copa Sudamericana Championship.

Kashima Antlers
In January 2020, Sugioka signed for Kashima Antlers. Sugioka struggled to break into the team in his first season at the club, only making eight appearances in all competitions.

International career
In May 2017, Sugioka was selected to play for the Japan U-20 national team for the 2017 U-20 World Cup. At this tournament, he played two full matches at left-back. He continued through the national youth teams, representing the U-21 national team at the 2018 Toulon Tournament and the U-23 national team at the 2018 Asian Games, where the team finished as runners-up after a 2-1 extra-time defeat to South Korea. He also represented the U-23s at the 2020 AFC U-23 Championship.

On May 24 2019, Sugioka was called up by Japan's head coach Hajime Moriyasu to feature in the Copa América, played in Brazil. He made his debut on 17 June 2019 in a game against Chile, starting the game at left-back and playing the full 90 minutes. Sugioka went on to make two more appearances in the 2019 Copa América, but has not been capped since.

Career statistics

Club
.

International

Honours

Club
Shonan Bellmare
J2 League: 2017
J.League Cup: 2018

International
Football at the 2018 Asian Games: 2018 Runner-up

References

External links
Profile at Shonan Bellmare

1998 births
Living people
Japanese footballers
Japan youth international footballers
Japan under-20 international footballers
Japan international footballers
J1 League players
J2 League players
Shonan Bellmare players
Kashima Antlers players
Association football defenders
Footballers at the 2018 Asian Games
Asian Games silver medalists for Japan
Asian Games medalists in football
Medalists at the 2018 Asian Games
2019 Copa América players